The National Sanctuary Complex "Sophia of Kyiv" is a historic preserve that contains a complex of museums in Kyiv and Sudak and responsible for maintenance and preservation of some of its most precious historic sites.

List of landmarks in the complex

Kyiv
 Complex of Saint Sophia Cathedral, prime landmark 
 Golden Gates, part of Sofia of Kyiv since 1983
 St. Cyril's Monastery, created in 1929, was transferred to Sofia of Kyiv in 1965
 St Andrew's Church, part of All-Ukrainian Historic Site 1935, it was transferred to Sofia of Kyiv in 1939 and 1968

Crimea
 Sudak fortress, created in 1371–1460, became a part of Sofia of Kyiv in 1958

History

In 1934, by the order of the authorities of the Soviet Ukraine, the creation of the cultural preserve (sanctuary) at the site of the Saint Sophia Cathedral likely saved one of the holiest sites in Eastern Europe from destruction during the Soviet-wide anti-religious campaign of the early 1930s. The preserve was established in place of the cathedral of the Ukrainian Autocephalous Orthodox Church that was dissolved in 1930. The museum's responsibilities were gradually expanded to other historic locations of Kyiv.

In 1994, the sanctuary was accorded its current status as being National.

Both St. Andrew and St. Cyril churches are acting. The first church belongs to the Ukrainian Autocephalous Orthodox Church, while the other belongs to the Ukrainian Orthodox Church (Moscow Patriarchate) and is part of the revived St. Cyril's Monastery.

See also
 List of historic reserves in Ukraine

References
  Sophiakievska.org: official Sophia of Kyiv website—
 Kateryna Shchotkina, "An ordinary date of Sophia", Zerkalo Nedeli (The Mirror Weekly), October 16–22, 2006, in Russian, in Ukrainian.

.01
Historic sites in Ukraine
Landmarks in Kyiv
Shevchenkivskyi District, Kyiv
Protected areas of Kyiv
Protected areas established in 1934
1934 establishments in Ukraine